Diving at the 2013 Southeast Asian Games took place in Naypyidaw, Myanmar between December 18–21. Eight competitions held in both, men and women's. All competition took place at the Wunna Theikdi Aquatics Centre.

Results

Men

Women

Medal table

References